The following data is current as of the end of the 2014 season, which ended after the 2014 NCAA Division III Football Championship. The following list reflects the records according to the NCAA. This list takes into account results modified later due to NCAA action, such as vacated victories and forfeits.  Percentages are figured to 3 decimal places. In the event of a tie, the team with the most wins is listed first. This list also includes teams that are in the process of transitioning to NCAA Division III (Belhaven from NAIA).

 In the process of transitioning to NCAA Division III
 Alfred State College is transitioning and their football stats are incomplete
 Belhaven is transitioning and their football stats are incomplete
*Ties count as one-half win and one-half loss.

References

Lists of college football team records